Table tennis at the 1980 Summer Paralympics consisted of 32 events, 22 for men and 10 for women.

Medal table

Medal summary

Men's events

Women's events

References 

 

1980 Summer Paralympics events
1980
Paralympics